The Twelve-Mile Circle is an approximately circular arc which forms most of the boundary between Pennsylvania and Delaware. It is not actually a circle, but rather a combination of different circular arcs that have been feathered together.

It is nominally a circle with a supposed—yet in fact only approximate and variable— radius, centered in the town of New Castle, Delaware. In 1750, the center of the circle was fixed at the cupola of the courthouse in New Castle. The Twelve-Mile Circle continues into the Delaware River. A small portion of the circle, known as the "Arc Line," also forms part of the Mason-Dixon line, separating Delaware and Maryland. Two other small portions, although not actually demarcated until 1934, form parts of the boundary between the states of Delaware and New Jersey. Although the Twelve-Mile Circle is often claimed to be the only territorial boundary in the United States that is a true arc, many cities in the South (such as Plains, Georgia) also have circular boundaries.

Its existence dates back to 1681, when Charles II granted a deed to William Penn north of the already chartered Maryland. Charles created an exception, consisting of 12 miles around the town of New Castle and extending down the peninsula, as these lands were held by the Duke of York, who had won them in conquest from the Dutch colonists. Later, on August 24, 1682, the Duke granted these lands to Penn as well, giving him:

The boundaries of the circle were the focal point of the eighty-year Penn–Calvert Boundary Dispute.

The fact that the circle extends into the Delaware River makes for an unusual territorial possession. Most territorial boundaries that follow watercourses split the water course between the two territories by one of two methods, either by the median line of the watercourse (the Grotian Method, after Hugo Grotius) or, more often, the center of the main flow channel, or thalweg (the lowest point in the stream channel). However, due to the text of the deed, within the Twelve-Mile Circle, all the Delaware River to the low-tide mark on the east (New Jersey) side is territory of the state of Delaware (a similar condition exists between the states of Vermont and New Hampshire, with the border being defined as the west bank of the Connecticut River, leaving the river - and bridges - in sole possession of New Hampshire).

New Jersey has often disputed this claim, as the rest of its territorial boundaries along the Delaware River are determined by the midline and thalweg methods. In 1813, Delaware's legislature passed an act deeding Pea Patch Island to the United States government, and in 1820 New Jersey disputed that they owned the island since it was primarily on the New Jersey side of the river. Attorney General William Wirt sided with Delaware. In the 1840s, the Pea Patch Island disagreement led to two conflicting circuit court decisions—the circuit of Delaware ruling that the entirety of the river (and its islands) belonged to Delaware, and the circuit in New Jersey ruling that the island had belonged to New Jersey, which had deeded it to Dr. Henry Gale, a citizen of New Jersey. At the recommendation of President James K. Polk, the parties agreed to arbitration, which resulted in a confirmation of Delaware's claim.

The arbitration did not ultimately resolve the dispute, and it has been brought to the Supreme Court of the United States on several occasions (all titled New Jersey v. Delaware), most notably in 1877, 1934, 1935, and 2007. The court's opinion for the 1934 case contained an extensive history of the claims to this territory, and the 1935 opinion memorably enjoined New Jersey and Delaware from ever disputing their jurisdictions again.

Regardless of the Supreme Court's admonition to the two states against further litigation on this subject, they were back before the court as late as November 2005, when New Jersey's desire to approve plans by BP to build a liquefied natural gas terminal along the New Jersey shore of the Delaware River fell afoul of Delaware's Coastal Zone Act.
The court on January 23, 2006, appointed a special master to study the border dispute, and on March 21, 2008, it upheld his report, which largely supported Delaware's authority.
Meanwhile, the Delaware House of Representatives considered a (symbolic) bill to call out the National Guard to safeguard the state's interests, while New Jersey legislators made comments about the battleship New Jersey, moored upriver from the site.

Surveying the Circle
There are persistent rumors that David Rittenhouse, the famous astronomer and instrument-maker of Pennsylvania, surveyed the circle around New Castle, but this is likely not correct. The circle was first laid out by surveyors named Taylor and Pierson in 1701. The 1813 "Memoirs of the life of David Rittenhouse" by William Barton surmises that Rittenhouse was involved in such a survey in 1763, based on a letter in which Rittenhouse mentions being paid "for my attendance at New Castle," but there is no clear record of what, exactly, Rittenhouse was paid for. His biographer, Brooke Hindle, guessed that Rittenhouse assisted with latitude or longitude calculations.

See also
 Penn–Calvert Boundary Dispute
 Wedge (border)
 Transpeninsular Line
 Killcohook National Wildlife Refuge
 Mason-Dixon line

References

Border irregularities of the United States
Borders of Delaware
Borders of Maryland
Borders of New Jersey
Borders of Pennsylvania
Geography of Cecil County, Maryland
Geography of Chester County, Pennsylvania
Geography of Delaware County, Pennsylvania
Geography of Maryland
Geography of New Castle County, Delaware
Geography of Salem County, New Jersey
Internal territorial disputes of the United States